Secret EP is an EP by the American indie rock band Sebadoh, released on July 23, 2012. The EP was not released on a label and was made available for digital download on the online music store Bandcamp. The EP was recorded from March to July 2012 at Indietopia in Glendale, California. Secret EP is Sebadoh's first new material in fourteen years since the band's previous album The Sebadoh (1999).

Recording
Sebadoh began recording Secret EP on March 29, 2012 at frontman Lou Barlow's rehearsal space. Updates from the recording sessions were posted by band member Jason Loewenstein on his official Blogger. The basic tracks for eleven potential songs were completed by April 10. In May, the band began the second and final recording sessions and by June the band began mixing the EP and recording overdubs. On July 18, the band announced on its official Facebook page that mixing had been completed and the tracks were going to be mastered the following day. The recording sessions were produced and engineered by Lowenstein.

Release
Secret EP was released on July 23, 2012. The EP was released as a digital download on the online music store Bandcamp in MP3 and FLAC formats. The band posted release notes with the download calling the EP "new songs for 2012, a taste of our upcoming 2013 album" but confirmed none of the songs would be featured on the album. The band also stated that proceeds from the EP's sales will "help us continue working on the LP and remain as independent as possible," adding that CD copies of the EP will be available for sale during the band's tour in support of Secret EP.

Tour
Sebadoh are due to tour to support the release of Secret EP. The North American tour begins in Philadelphia, Pennsylvania on August 7, 2012 and concludes in New York, New York on August 28.

Track listing

Personnel
All personnel credits adapted from the album's online release notes.

Sebadoh
Lou Barlow – vocals, guitar, bass
Jason Loewenstein – vocals, guitar, bass
Bob D'Amico – drums, percussion

Technical personnel
Jason Loewenstein – producer, engineer, mixing (1, 2, 4, 5)
Andrew Murdock – mixing (3)

References

External links
Official release page at Bandcamp
Post 'Secret EP' interview with Lou Barlow (via Talk Rock To Me) August 17, 2012

2012 EPs
Sebadoh albums